×

Earl Thomas Wagner (April 27, 1908 – March 6, 1990) was an American lawyer and politician who served one term as a U.S. Representative from Ohio from 1949 to 1951.

Biography 
Born in Cincinnati, Ohio, Wagner attended parochial and public schools.
He was graduated from the Salmon P. Chase College of Law, Cincinnati, Ohio, in 1930.
He was admitted to the bar in September 1930 and commenced the practice of law in Cincinnati, Ohio.
He served as district counsel of Home Owners Loan Corporation in 1933 and 1934.
He served as special counsel to the Ohio Attorney General in 1937 and 1938.
City solicitor of Sharonville, Ohio, in 1938 and 1939.
He served as member of the board of education of the Cincinnati School district 1944-1947.

Congress 
Wagner was elected as a Democrat to the Eighty-first Congress (January 3, 1949 – January 3, 1951).
He was an unsuccessful candidate for reelection in 1950 and for election to the United States House of Representatives in 1952 and 1954.

After Congress 
He resumed the practice of law.
City solicitor of Addyston, Ohio, in 1952 and 1953.
He served as general counsel for a savings and loan bank in Cincinnati.
He was a resident of Cincinnati, until his death there on March 6, 1990.

Sources

1908 births
1990 deaths
Politicians from Cincinnati
Ohio lawyers
Salmon P. Chase College of Law alumni
20th-century American lawyers
20th-century American politicians
Democratic Party members of the United States House of Representatives from Ohio